Putting Things Straight (German title: “Ich räume auf”) is a 1979 film directed and written by Georg Brintrup. The director's first TV-release, it was shot in 16 mm film. The filmscript is based on a polemic printed in 1925 ("Ich räume auf - Meine Anklage gegen meine Verleger") by the Jewish German poet Else Lasker-Schüler, the principal woman representative of German Expressionism.

Premise
The film describes a dispute between poetess Else Lasker-Schüler and her publishers. The film takes place in Berlin before, during and after World War I it deals with the rights of the author quoting from Karl Marx: "A writer is judged as productive, not on the amount of ideas he produces, but on the amount of money his publisher is able to profit from his works."

Cast
 Gisela Stein – Else Lasker-Schüler
Frank Burkner – Paul Cassirer
Hanns Zischler – Alfred Flechtheim
Ulrich Gregor – Kurt Wolff (publisher)
Hans Christoph Buch – Franz Werfel
Harun Farocki – Friend of Flechtheim

Production
The film was first broadcast on December 23, 1979 by Westdeutscher Rundfunk. It was then shown at the 1980 International Film Festival Rotterdam

References

External links
 

Films set in Berlin
1970s historical drama films
Films based on poems
Films set in the 1910s
German historical drama films
1979 films
Films about Jews and Judaism
Films set in the 1920s
1970s German-language films
1979 drama films
1970s English-language films
1970s German films
West German films